Glenn Allen may refer to:

Glenn Allen Jr. (born 1970), racing driver and co-owner of Allen-Hock Motorsports
Glenn Seven Allen, American actor and operatic tenor

See also
Glennallen, Alaska
Glen Allen, Virginia